Collegiate is a 1926, American silent romantic comedy film directed by Del Andrews and starring Alberta Vaughn, Donald Keith and John Steppling.

Cast
 Alberta Vaughn as Patricia Steele 
 Donald Keith as Jimmy Baxter 
 John Steppling as Mr. Steele 
 Alys Murrell as Iris Vale 
 William Austin as G. Horace Crumbleigh 
 Frank Adams as Bumpter Smith
 Charles Cruz as Piggy

References

Bibliography
 Munden, Kenneth White. The American Film Institute Catalog of Motion Pictures Produced in the United States, Part 1. University of California Press, 1997.

External links

1926 films
1926 romantic comedy films
Films directed by Del Andrews
American silent feature films
Film Booking Offices of America films
American romantic comedy films
American black-and-white films
1920s English-language films
1920s American films
Silent romantic comedy films
Silent American comedy films